Onanay is a 2018 Philippine family drama series broadcast by GMA Network. The series aired on the network's Telebabad evening block and worldwide via GMA Pinoy TV from August 6, 2018 to March 15, 2019, replacing Kambal, Karibal.

NUTAM (Nationwide Urban Television Audience Measurement) People in Television Homes ratings are provided by AGB Nielsen Philippines.

Series overview

Episodes

August 2018

September 2018

October 2018

November 2018

December 2018

January 2019

February 2019

March 2019

References

Lists of Philippine drama television series episodes